Archeological Site 3NW79 is a prehistoric pictograph site in the Ozark-St. Francis National Forest, in Newton County, Arkansas.  It consists of a panel of twenty figures, set in a sheltered area.  It is expected to contribute to the understanding of Mississippian cultures that lived in the area c. 1000-1500 CE.

The site was listed on the National Register of Historic Places in 2007 for its information potential.

See also
National Register of Historic Places listings in Newton County, Arkansas

References

Archaeological sites on the National Register of Historic Places in Arkansas
Rock art in North America
Ozark–St. Francis National Forest
National Register of Historic Places in Newton County, Arkansas
Mississippian culture
Native American history of Arkansas